is a Japanese post-hardcore group from Okinawa Prefecture, Japan, and a headliner of the Utanohi music festival. They are currently signed to an Independent record label, BORNtoLOVE Records, which is owned by the members of 2side1brain. They released their first album "Singing Like Flood" on August 20, 2008 and their second album "Wake Up My Emerald" on November 24, 2010.  Their upcoming third studio album, "Blood Red Eyes" was released on August 15, 2012.

Discography

Studio albums

EPs

Videography

Music videos
 "Wake Up My Emerald"
 "Pray For You"
 "You Are Beautiful"

See also
 Okinawan music
 Music of Japan

External links
 Label Site

References

Musical groups from Okinawa Prefecture